Martín Daniel Irigoyen (born January 14, 1977) is an Argentine musician best known as a composer and multi-instrumentalist with Vernian Process and Profondo Delle Tenebre. He has participated in many solo and group projects outside of Vernian Process, as well as being an active producer.

Career
Irigoyen was born in Buenos Aires, Argentina, where he participated in numerous musical projects in various styles. In 2008 he joined Steampunk pioneers Vernian Process as a full-time member. Vernian Process has shared the stage with artists such as Thomas Dolby, Attrition, Skinny Puppy, Voltaire (musician), Jill Tracy, Abney Park and others.

Irigoyen uses various effects and utensils to create original guitar soundscapes. He also uses alternate tunings and plays several different styles.
Being a prepared guitar player, he uses for his performances items such as screwdrivers, tweezers, hangers, drumsticks, and more.

References

Vernian Process on MTV. 
[reverse obvious] review by Chelsea Cochran. 
Independent Musician Magazine review by Daniela Cleveland. 
Band of the week - The Skyline View. 
The Owl Magazine album review. 
Garageband.com reviews.

External links 
Vernian Process official website
Gilded Age Records official website
Puppet Radio on MySpace
Modelle Nude on YouTube
Sodium Channel on Reverb Nation

1977 births
Argentine musicians
Living people